{{DISPLAYTITLE:Rho1 Cephei}}

Rho1 Cephei (ρ1 Cephei) is a double star located in the northern constellation of Cepheus. As of 2014, the pair had an angular separation of 0.29 arc seconds along a position angle of 211.1°. This corresponds to a projected separation of 18.1 AU. Rho1 Cephei is faintly visible to the naked eye with an apparent visual magnitude of 5.84, and it forms an optical pair with the brighter star Rho2 Cephei. Based upon an annual parallax shift of 15.83 mas as seen from the Earth, Rho1 Cephei is located about 206 light years from the Sun.

The primary component is a chemically peculiar Am star with a stellar classification of A2m. It has twice the mass of the Sun and is around 320 million years old. The smaller companion may be the source of the X-ray emission from this location, as stars similar to the primary component do not generally produce detectable levels of X-rays.

References

Cephei, Rho1
Am stars
Double stars
Cepheus (constellation)
Cephei, Rho1
Cephei, 28
213403
110787
8578
Durchmusterung objects